
Trevor Stubley RP RBA RSW RWS (27 March 1932 – 8 January 2010) was a Yorkshire portrait and landscape painter, and illustrator.

Stubley was born in Leeds and received art training at Leeds College of Art, and in 1953 at Edinburgh College of Art. He was a lecturer at Huddersfield School of Art from 1958 to 1960, afterwards working as a freelance artist from his own studio at Upperthong.

Stubley received 500 portrait commissions (including those for the HM the Queen, Alan Ayckbourn, Dame Judi Dench, J B Priestley and Dame Janet Baker), illustrated over 400 children's books, and painted landscape watercolours in 18 countries for the last 23 years of his life. He exhibited within Yorkshire, Lancashire, Nottinghamshire, Ireland and the USA, and his paintings are held in private and public collections, particularly at the National Portrait Gallery, Windsor Castle, the Palace of Westminster, the British Library, various universities throughout the UK, and at his own gallery on the outskirts of Holmfirth.

From 1994 to 1999, Stubley served as Vice President of the Royal Society of Portrait Painters, and was made an honorary member of the society in 2003. He died in Holmfirth, aged 77.

Prizes

1955 – Andrew Grant Major Travelling Scholar
1955 – William Hoffman Wood Gold Medal for Painting
1981–82 – Yorkshire TV Fine Art fellowship
1982 – Arts Council Award
1986 – Hunting Group Art Prize
1990 – Singer and Friedlander/Sunday Times Prize

Selected illustrated books
 Bradburne, Elizabeth S. (1968) Hey Diddle Dumpling; Schofield & Sims Ltd. 
 Mayne, William (1968) The Yellow Aeroplane; Reindeer Books / Hamish Hamilton. 
 Naughton, Bill (1975) The Goalkeeper's Revenge; London: Macmillan
Boshell, Gordon (1977) Captain Cobwebb and the Mischief Man; Macdonald & Jane's. 
 White, T. H. (1978) The Book of Merlyn: The Unpublished Conclusion to The Once and Future; Berkley Medallion. 
 Dale, Alan T. (1979) Portrait of Jesus; Oxford University Press. 
 Cate, Dick (1980) Old Dog, New Tricks; Puffin Books. 
 Pinto, Jaqueline (1983) The School Dinner Disaster; Hamish Hamilton Ltd. 
 Andrews, Ian (1987) Boudica Against Rome (Cambridge introduction to world history); Cambridge University Press. . Illustrated with Graham Humphreys.
 Escott, John (1987) Radio Alert; Puffin Books. 
 Mahy, Margaret (1987) Clancy's Cabin; Puffin Books. 
 Hardcastle, Michael (1989) Free Kick; Mammoth.

References

External links
Artist's web site (profile). Retrieved 23 November 2011

"Obituary: Trevor Stubley"; Huddersfield Examiner. Retrieved 23 November 2011
"Gallery: A fitting tribute to Trevor Stubley"; Huddersfield Examiner. Retrieved 23 November 2011

1932 births
2010 deaths
20th-century English painters
English male painters
21st-century English painters
English illustrators
Artists from Leeds
People from Holmfirth
Alumni of Leeds Arts University
Alumni of the Edinburgh College of Art
20th-century English male artists
21st-century English male artists